(Heaven laughs! Earth exults), 31, is a church cantata by Johann Sebastian Bach for the first day of Easter. Bach composed the cantata in Weimar and first performed it on 21 April 1715.

History and words 
On 2 March 1714 Bach was appointed concertmaster of the Weimar court capelle of the co-reigning dukes Wilhelm Ernst and Ernst August of Saxe-Weimar. Bach composed the cantata for Easter Sunday in 1715. The prescribed readings for the feast day were from the First letter to the Corinthians, "Christ is our Easter lamb", and from the Gospel of Mark, the Resurrection of Jesus. The verses consist purely of free poetry and interpret the Easter message, connected to the request to believers to let Jesus also be resurrected within their souls. The final movement, the last verse of the chorale "" (When my hour is come) by Nikolaus Herman, expresses the desire to die, to follow Jesus in resurrection.

Bach first performed the cantata on 21 April 1715. Looking at the rich scoring of three instrumental groups and a five-part choir, John Eliot Gardiner suggests that the cantata was not performed in the court's small , but in the town church St. Peter und Paul, where the ducal family evidently at times attended services. Bach later performed the cantata several times in Leipzig in a slightly modified form. There is proof of performances for the years 1724 and 1731; a further performance in 1735 is probable as well. Since the Weimar tuning of the organ, which served as a reference for the string instruments, was probably a third higher than the standard tuning tone in Leipzig, Bach had to either leave out the voices of the reed instruments or rewrite them for the Leipzig performances, or to replace the parts by different instruments.

Scoring and structure 
The cantata in nine movements is festively scored for three vocal soloists (soprano, tenor  and bass), a five-part choir (SSATB), three trumpets, timpani, three oboes, taille (tenor oboe), bassoon, two violins, two violas, two cellos and basso continuo. The scoring for five parts in the choir, five parts in the woodwinds and six parts in the strings is unusual.

Music 
The festive character of the work is demonstrated by a sonata with a fanfare-like introduction, a concerto of the three groups brass, reeds and strings, all divided in many parts. The first choral movement, sung by a five-part chorus, evokes the "celestial laughter and worldly jubilation" of the text, according to John Eliot Gardiner, who continues: 

The bass voice announces the resurrection of Jesus in a recitative and continues in an aria, both accompanied only by the continuo. The aria, marked Molto adagio, praises Jesus as "Prince of life" and "strong fighter".

The higher tenor voice addresses in a recitative the soul to look to the "new life in spirit", followed by a bright aria, accompanied by the strings, which speaks of "" (the new man), free from sin.

The highest voice, the soprano, sings in the first person as the soul in a recitative, convinced of taking part in the resurrection. In the last aria, soprano and solo oboe in echo-effects contrast with low-lying unison strings, which already anticipate the closing chorale's melody. The hymn is a "death-bed chorale", set for a four-part choir, crowned by a descant from the trumpet and first violin.

Recordings 
 The RIAS Bach Cantatas Project (1949–1952), Karl Ristenpart, RIAS-Kammerchor, RIAS-Kammerorchester, Lilo Rolwes, Helmut Krebs, Gerhard Niese, Audite 1950
 J. S. Bach: Cantata No. 31; Seven Easter Chorales, Felix Prohaska, Wiener Kammerchor, Wiener Kammerorchester, Anny Felbermayer, Waldemar Kmentt, Walter Berry, Bach Guild 1952
 J. S. Bach: Cantata BWV 31 & Magnificat BWV 243, Marcel Couraud, Stuttgarter Bach-Chor, Badische Staatskapelle, Friederike Sailer, Fritz Wunderlich, August Messthaler, Philips 1956
 Les Grandes Cantates de J. S. Bach Vol. 17, Fritz Werner, Heinrich-Schütz-Chor Heilbronn, Pforzheim Chamber Orchestra, Agnes Giebel, Helmut Krebs, Erich Wenk, Erato 1963
 J. S. Bach: Das Kantatenwerk · Complete Cantatas · Les Cantates, Folge / Vol. 9, Nikolaus Harnoncourt, Wiener Sängerknaben, Chorus Viennensis, Concentus Musicus Wien, soloists of the Wiener Sängerknaben, Kurt Equiluz, Siegmund Nimsgern, Teldec 1973
 Bach Made in Germany Vol. 4 – Cantatas VII, Hans-Joachim Rotzsch, Thomanerchor, Gewandhausorchester, Helga Termer, Eberhard Büchner, Hermann Christian Polster, Eterna 1976
 J. S. Bach: Complete Cantatas Vol. 1, Ton Koopman, Amsterdam Baroque Orchestra & Choir, Barbara Schlick, Guy de Mey, Klaus Mertens, Antoine Marchand 1994
 J. S. Bach: Cantatas Vol. 6 – BWV 21, 31, Masaaki Suzuki, Bach Collegium Japan, Monika Frimmer, Gerd Türk, Peter Kooy, BIS 1997
 Bach Cantatas Vol. 22: Eisenach / For Easter Sunday / For Easter Monday / For Easter Monday / For Easter Tuesday, John Eliot Gardiner, Monteverdi Choir, English Baroque Soloists, Gillian Keith, James Gilchrist, Stephen Varcoe, Soli Deo Gloria 2000
 Bach Edition Vol. 21 – Cantatas Vol. 12, Pieter Jan Leusink, Holland Boys Choir, Netherlands Bach Collegium, Ruth Holton, Nico van der Meel, Bas Ramselaar, Brilliant Classics 2000

References

External links 
 
 Der Himmel lacht, die Erde jubilieret (Weimar version) BWV 31; BC A 55a / Sacred cantata Bach Digital
 Der Himmel lacht, die Erde jubilieret (Leipzig version) BWV 31; BC A 55b / Sacred cantata Bach Digital
 Cantata BWV 31 Der Himmel lacht! Die Erde jubilieret history, scoring, sources for text and music, translations to various languages, discography, discussion, Bach Cantatas Website
 Luke Dahn: BWV 31.9 bach-chorales.com

Church cantatas by Johann Sebastian Bach
1715 compositions
Music for Easter